Paul Hardtmuth (2 July 18885 January 1962) was a British actor.

He made his film debut in Germany in 1917, and appeared in and co-wrote the film Um der Liebe Willen in 1920.

He was born in 1888 in Berlin, and died on 5 January 1962 in Hampstead, London.

Partial filmography
 Um der Liebe Willen (1920)
 Die büßende Magdalena (1922) - Geselle vom Schmied
 Only One Night (1922) - Boka, ein alter Zigeuner
 Frauen, die die Ehe brechen (1922) - Petrasch
 The Big Thief (1922) - Bolten
 Bedelia (1946) - Old Frenchman
 I Was a Male War Bride (1949) - German Mayor (uncredited)
 The Lost People (1949) - Jiri
 The Third Man (1949) - Hartman - Hall Porter at Hotel Sacher (uncredited)
 Highly Dangerous (1950) - Priest
 The Wonder Kid (1951) - Professor Bindl
 Desperate Moment (1953) - Wharf Watchman
 Street of Shadows (1953) - J.M. Mayall
 The Diamond (1954) - Dr. Eric Miller
 Timeslip (1955) - Dr. Bressler
 All for Mary (1955) - Porter
 The Gamma People (1956) - Hans 
 Assignment Redhead (1955) - Dr. Buchmann
 Odongo (1956) - Mohammed
 The Curse of Frankenstein (1957) - Professor Bernstein
 The House of the Seven Hawks (1959) - Beukleman
 Doctor Blood's Coffin (1961) - Prof. Luckman

Selected television

References

External links
 

1888 births
1962 deaths
British male film actors
British male television actors
20th-century British male actors
Male actors from Berlin
German emigrants to the United Kingdom